Cleidogona fustis is a species of millipede in the family Cleidogonidae.

References

Further reading

 

Chordeumatida
Articles created by Qbugbot
Animals described in 1895